Domestic energy consumption is the total amount of energy used in a house for household work. The amount of energy used per household varies widely depending on the standard of living of the country, the climate, and the age and type of residence.

In the United States as of 2008, in an average household in a temperate climate, the yearly use of household energy can be composed as follows:

This equates to an average instantaneous power consumption of 2 kW at any given time.

Households in different parts of the world will have differing levels of consumption, based on latitude and technology.

As of 2015, the average annual household electricity consumption in the US is 10,766 kWh.

See also
 2000-watt society
 Zero-energy building

References

Energy consumption